Grudge: The Revolt of Gumiho is a 2010 South Korean television series starring Han Eun-jung, Jang Hyun-sung, Kim Yoo-jung and Seo Shin-ae. It aired on KBS2 from July 5 to August 24, 2010 on Mondays and Tuesdays at 21:55 for 18 episodes.

Plot
Set during the Joseon Dynasty, a beautiful gumiho (nine-tailed fox in Korean folklore) named Gu San-daek leaves her husband after he breaks his promise to marry her in their tenth year together, and his betrayal renders her unable to shapeshift. San-daek has a daughter, Yeon-yi. Born of a human father and a fox mother, the innocent young girl has yet to gain the ability to use her gumiho powers. The two cursed souls wander searching for a safe place to stay, and arrive at a village where they meet Yoon Doo-soo, a seemingly kind and gentle former official. But Doo-soo's daughter Cho-ok suffers from a mystical disease, and the only way to save her is to feed her the liver of a girl of the same age. When he realizes that San-daek and her daughter have no place to go, and that Yeon-yi is the same age as his daughter, he takes them in and awaits the perfect time to strike. But Doo-soo begins to fall for San-daek, and Cho-ok starts to envy her father's interest in the mysterious mother and daughter. Meanwhile, as Yeon-yi turns ten years old, her physical transformation begins, and thus the tale of love, betrayal, friendship and jealousy begins.

Cast
Han Eun-jung as Gu San-daek/Gumiho
Jang Hyun-sung as Yoon Doo-soo
Kim Yoo-jung as Yeon-yi
Seo Shin-ae as Yoon Cho-ok
Kim Jung-nan as Lady Yang
Kim Kyu-chul as steward Oh
Seo Jun-young as Chun-woo
Im Seo-yeon as Kye-hyang
Kim Woo-seok  as Yoon Choong-il
Woo Min-gyu  as Yoon Choong-yi
Chun Ho-jin as Manshin, a shaman
Park Soo-hyun as exorcist
Yoon Hee-seok as village leader Jo 
Lee Tae-ri as Jo Jung-kyu 
Go Jung-min as Village leader Jo's wife
Baek Bong-ki as Ba-wi
Jung Eun-pyo as Gumiho's husband
Kim Do-yeon as Un-nyun
Han So-jung as Sam-wol
Han Si-yoon as Yoo-wol
Kim Hyuk as Man-seok
Jang Hang-sun as monk
Lee Dae-ro as royal physician
Choi Hye-kyung as So-yeon
 Shin Dong-mi as So-yeon's mother

Notes

Ratings
In this table, the blue numbers represent the lowest ratings and the red numbers represent the highest ratings.

Awards
2010 KBS Drama Awards 
Excellence Award, Actress in a Miniseries: Han Eun-jung
Best Young Actress: Kim Yoo-jung and Seo Shin-ae

International broadcast

References

External links
  
 
 
 

2010 South Korean television series debuts
2010 South Korean television series endings
Korean Broadcasting System television dramas
Television shows involved in plagiarism controversies
South Korean fantasy television series
South Korean horror fiction television series